Warley Moor Reservoir, also known as Fly Flatts Reservoir, is a drinking water reservoir in West Yorkshire, England, owned and operated by Yorkshire Water.

Completed in 1872, the reservoir was built by the engineer John Frederick La Trobe Bateman. The first sod was cut on 20 May 1864, by the then Mayor of Halifax, William Holdsworth, who used a silver spade with the inscription:

It was notably described in Whiteley Turner's 1913 book A Spring-Time Saunter: Round and About Bronte Land.

The reservoir is used by Halifax Sailing Club. It is also famous for being the reservoir Tommy Lee Royce cycled to in Series 3 of the BBC show Happy Valley.

References

External links 

 

Drinking water reservoirs in England
Works by John Frederick Bateman
Reservoirs in West Yorkshire